This is a list of provosts of Inverness.

In 2012, the traditional functions of the Provost were controversially divided by the creation of a new executive role of "leader of the city". On 13 August 2012, Ian Brown was the first person to be appointed to work alongside the provost as leader of the city.

16th Century
 1556 – 1559: George Cuthbert of Auld Castlehill
 1560 – 1561: Jasper Waus of Lochslyne
 1562 – 1563: John Ross
 1564 – 1567: James Paterson
 1568 – 1568: Alexander Baillie
 1569 – 1569: William Cuthbert
 1570 – 1572: James Paterson
 1573 – 1574: William Cuthbert
 1575 – 1575: John Ross
 1576 – 1576: James Paterson
 1577 – 1577: William Cuthbert
 1578 – 1579: William Baillie of Dunain
 1580 – 1580: William Cuthbert
 1581 – 1582: William Baillie of Dunnane
 1583 – 1583: John Cuthbert of Auld Castlehill
 1584 – 1584: John Ross
 1585 – 1586: William Cuthbert

17th Century
 1602 – 1603: William Cuthbert
 1603 – 1606: Master John Ross of Midleys
 1607 – 1614: John Cuthbert of Auld Castlehill
 1615 – 1616: Mr John Ross
 1616 – 1617: John Cuthbert of Auld Castlehill
 1617 – 1618: Alexander Baillie of Dunzean
 1618 – 1619: Mr John Ross
 1620 – 1621: James Cuthbert of Easter Drakies
 1622 – 1623: James Cuthbert of Lochelin
 1623 – 1624: Mr John Ross of Midleys
 1624 – 1625: Alexander Baillie of Dunzean
 1625 – 1627: Duncan Forbes of Buddit
 1628 – 1629: James Cuthbert of Easter Draikies
 1630 – 1630: Andrew Fraser
 1631 – 1631: James Cuthbert of Draikies
 1632 – 1632: Duncan Forbes of Bucht
 1633 – 1633: Duncan Forbes
 1634 – 1635: Mr John Ross Younger
 1636 – 1636: James Cuthbert of Draikies
 1636 – 1638: John Cuthbert, Wester Draikies
 1638 – 1639: Master John Ross
 1639 – 1640: James Cuthbert of Easter Draikies
 1640 – 1643: James Ross of Merkinch
 1643 – 1645: Duncan Forbes of Culloden
 1645 – 1646: James Cuthbert of Easter Draikies
 1646 – 1651: John Forbes, fiar of Culloden
 1651 – 1652: Robert Ross
 1652 – 1655: John Forbes
 1655 – 1655: Robert Ross
 1655 – 1662: No council records
 1662 – 1662: Alexander Cuthbert
 1662 – 1663: Robert Ross
 1663 – 1666: Alexander Cuthbert
 1666 – 1668: Alexander Dunbar (elder)
 1668 – 1674: Alexander Cuthbert
 1674 – 1679: Alexander Dunbar
 1679 – 1680: Alexander Cuthbert
 1680 – 1683: Alexander Dunbar
 1683 – 1689: John Cuthbert of Draikies
 1689 – 1692: Hugh Robertson
 1692 – 1695: William Duff (elder)
 1695 – 1699: Hugh Robertson
 1699 – 1701: William Duff (elder)

18th Century
 1701 – 1703: Hugh Robertson
 1703 – 1706: William Duff (elder)
 1706 – 1709: Alexander Duff of Drumore
 1709 – 1712: William Duff
 1712 – 1715: Alexander Duff of Drumore
 1715 – 1716: Alexander Clark, merchant
 1716 – 1718: John Forbes of Culloden
 1718 – 1720: Alexander Fraser
 1720–1723: John Forbes of Culloden
 1723–1725: Alexander Fraser
 1725 – 1728: John Forbes of Culloden
 1728–1729: Alexander Fraser
 1729–1732: John Forbes of Culloden
 1732–1735: Alexander Fraser
 1735–1738: John Hossack
 1738–1741: William Maclean of Dochgarroch
 1741–1744: John Hossack
 1744–1747: John Fraser
 1747–1750: William Maclean of Dochgarroch
 1750–1753: John Fraser
 1753–1756: John Hossack
 1756–1758: John Fraser
 1758–1761: John Hossack
 1761–1764: William Mackintosh (elder)
 1764–1767: James Fraser
 1767–1770: William Mackintosh (elder)
 1770–1773: Phineas Mackintosh
 1773–1776: William Chisholm
 1776–1779: Phineas Mackintosh
 1779–1782: William Chisholm
 1782–1785: Phineas Mackintosh
 1785–1788: William Mackintosh
 1788–1791: Phineas Mackintosh
 1791–1794: William Mackintosh
 1794–1797: John Mackintosh (of the Aberarder family)
 1797–1800: William Inglis of Kingsmills

19th Century
 1800–1803: John Mackintosh (of the Aberarder family)
 1803–1804: Alexander Mackintosh
 1804–1807: James Grant
 1807–1810: Thomas Gilzean
 1810–1813: James Grant
 1813–1814: Thomas Gilzean
 1814–1816: James Grant
 1816–1818: James Robertson
 1818–1822: Interim trustees
 1822–1823: James Robertson
 1823–1824: James Grant
 1824–1827: James Robertson
 1827–1829: James Grant
 1829–1831: James Robertson
 1831–1833: John Ross
 1833–1834: John Mackenzie
 1834–1836: John Fraser
 1836–1839: John Ferguson
 1839–1840: Alexander Cumming
 1840–1843: John Inglis Nicol
 1843–1846: James Sutherland
 1847–1852: William Simpson
 1852–1855: James Sutherland
 1855–1867: Colin Lyon Mackenzie
 1867–1873: John Mackenzie
 1873–1875: Colin Lyon Mackenzie
 1875–1880: Alexander Simpson
 1880 – 1880: William Mackintosh
 1880–1883: Alexander Fraser
 1883–1889: Henry Cockburn Macandrew
 1889–1895: Alexander Ross
 1895 – 1901: William Macbean

20th Century
 1901 – 1907: Arthur Dougal Ross
 1907 – 1910: James Alexander Gossip
 1910 – 1916: John Birnie
 1916 – 1922: Sir Donald Macdonald
 1922 – 1925: David Petrie
 1925 – 1931: Alexander MacEwen
1931 – 1933: Donald Macdonald (died in office)
1933 – 1934: John Mackenzie (died in office)
1934 – 1945: Hugh Mackenzie
1945 – 1949: Hugh Ross
1949 – 1955: James M Grigor
1955 – 1961: Robert Wotherspoon
1961 – 1964: Allan Ross
1964 – 1967: William J Mackay
1967 – 1975: William A Smith
1975 – 1980: Ian C Fraser
1980 – 1992: Allan G Sellar
1992 – 1996: William A E Fraser
1996 – 1999: Allan G Sellar
1999 – 2007: William J Smith

21st Century
 2007 – 2008: Robert Wynd
 2008 – 2012: Jimmy Gray
 2012 – 2015 Alex Graham
 2015 – Helen Carmichael
 2022 - Glynis Campbell-Sinclair, elected on 8 June 2022

References
   Am Baile: highland history and culture (website accessed on 14 June 2010).
 Alexander Macbain, Personal Names and Surnames of the Town of Inverness (Inverness, The Northern Counties Printing and Publishing Co. Ltd, 1895), at pp. 87–88 (1720 to 1895)

Inverness
Inverness
Provosts